The Washington and Lee Generals football team represents Washington and Lee University in Lexington, Virginia. The Generals compete at NCAA Division III level as members of the Old Dominion Athletic Conference.

History

19th century

Washington and Lee football dates back to 1873 with a one-game season, featuring a 4–2 win over the VMI Keydets. No player or coaching records are known from that game. UVA historians also remark on a game played between Virginia and Washington and Lee in 1871 with no records. The Generals would not have another intercollegiate team until 1890.

20th century
The first golden era of W&L football began in 1905. Between 1905 and 1917 the Generals reeled off 13 straight winning seasons. From 1912 to 1915, W&L went 32–3–1 and won the South Atlantic Intercollegiate Athletic Association (SAIAA) championship in 1914. The 1914 team, coached by Jogger Elcock, was the first team in school history to go undefeated (9–0). Members of that team include All-Southern lineman Ted Shultz and College Football Hall of Fame running back Harry Young. It secured a share of the title when it finished the season with a victory over North Carolina A&M. The school temporarily gave up football in 1954.

Playoff appearances

NCAA Division III
The Generals have appeared in the Division III playoffs six times, with an overall record of 0–6.

All-Americans

References

External links
 

 
American football teams established in 1890
1890 establishments in Virginia